Events in the year 2020 in Bahrain.

Incumbents 

 Monarch: Hamad ibn Isa Al Khalifa
 Prime Minister: Khalifa bin Salman Al Khalifa

Events 

 21 February – The country confirmed its first COVID-19 case, a school bus driver who came from Iran via Dubai.
 12 March – Hundreds of prisoners were ordered released in a bid to slow the spread of COVID-19.

Deaths

 11 November – Khalifa bin Salman Al Khalifa, former Prime Minister of Bahrain (b. 1935)

References 

 
2020s in Bahrain
Years of the 21st century in Bahrain
Bahrain 
Bahrain